The following is a list of Arkansas State Red Wolves football seasons for the football team that has represented Arkansas State University in NCAA competition.

Seasons

References

 
Arkansas State
Arkansas State Red Wolves football seasons